Svetlana Singh is a basketball player and reportedly is the tallest woman in Meerut, India at  in 2007. In 2014, Karan Singh was already  at five years old.

See also
 List of tallest people
 Vikas Uppal, another tall person from India

References

Indian women's basketball players
Living people
Year of birth missing (living people)
Place of birth missing (living people)
People from Meerut